Shutdown is the state of a nuclear reactor when the fission reaction is slowed significantly or halted completely. Different nuclear reactor designs have different definitions for what "shutdown" means, but it typically means that the reactor is not producing a measurable amount of electricity or heat, and is in a stable condition with very low reactivity.

Shutdown Margins and Scientific Definitions 
The shutdown margin for nuclear reactors (that is, when the reactor is considered to be safely in a shutdown state) is usually defined either in terms of reactivity or dollars. For reactivity, this is calculated in units of delta-k/k, where k is equal to the criticality of the reactor (essentially, how fast and controlled the nuclear fission reaction is). It is sometimes also measured in dollars, where one dollar is equal to a reactor in prompt criticality, this can then be used to calculate the change in reactivity required to shutdown or start up the reactor. 

The shutdown margin for each reactor can either refer to the margin by which a reactor is subcritical with all its control rods inserted, or as the margin by which the reactor would be shutdown in the event of a SCRAM. This margin has to be considered carefully for each reactor and reactor design, to ensure that it remains within the technical specifications and limitations of the reactor.

Neutron Poisoning 
A reactor can be unintentionally "shutdown" by having an excess of neutron poisons in the reactor vessel. Neutron poisons are chemical byproducts of the nuclear reaction which absorb neutrons, lowering reactivity in the reactor, and potentially stalling the reaction if enough poisons are allowed to build up. An example of this would be the Chernobyl Disaster in 1984, when Reactor No. 4 suffered from a serious xenon-132 poisoning, which pushed the reactor into an unstable condition which later caused the accident. While neutron poisoning is not considered a shutdown in and of itself, it often requires that the reactor be shutdown while the poisons are flushed from the system, as they can destabilise the reactor and cause it to behave unpredictably. 

Certain reactors, such as the CANDU reactor design (where it is called EPIS, or Emergency Poison Injection System), employ this phenomenon as part of their SCRAM procedure. When a SCRAM occurs, neutron poisons are injected into the reactor, to immediately lower the reactivity of the reactor, at the same time, or slightly prior to other shutdown mechanisms, such as control rods.

Cold Shutdown 
The difference between a normal shutdown and a cold shutdown is essentially in that the fuel has gone completely or almost completely cold and the reaction is only very barely active. In a typical shutdown, regular levels of coolant are still required, and the fuel remains reasonably hot, as it continues to react. In a cold shutdown, the coolant system is typically lowered to pump water at atmospheric pressure, and the reactor vessel remains below 93 °C (200 °F), and water passing through it will not boil. 

A cold shutdown is typically employed when operators need to access the reactor vessel for maintenance, fuel replenishing, or when the reactor has suffered damage of some kind that requires repairs. When a reactor is in cold shutdown, the fuel and control rods can be safely removed and exchanged, and maintenance can be performed. However, once a reactor has gone into a cold shutdown, it requires more time and energy to restart the reaction than if it had been hot.

See also

 Scram
 Iodine pit

References

https://www.msn.com/en-gb/news/techandscience/how-are-airliner-engines-overhauled/ar-AA13m9rg?ocid=msedgntp&cvid=8d6839a17f214dd49b5d57455dd1acfd

https://www.nuclear-power.com/nuclear-power-plant/what-is-nuclear-reactor/how-to-turn-the-nuclear-reactor-off-and-on/

Nuclear safety and security
Nuclear reactors